Peng Yang may refer to:

 Peng Yang (Han dynasty) (彭羕) (178–214), Chinese official of the Eastern Han dynasty
 Peng Yang (field hockey) (彭杨) (born 1992), Chinese field hockey player